The Men's snowboard cross competition at the FIS Freestyle Ski and Snowboarding World Championships 2023 was held on 1 March 2023.

Elimination round

1/16 finals

Heat 1

Heat 3

Heat 5

Heat 7

Heat 9

Heat 11

Heat 13

Heat 15

Heat 2

Heat 4

Heat 6

Heat 8

Heat 10

Heat 12

Heat 14

Heat 16

1/8 finals

Heat 1

Heat 3

Heat 5

Heat 7

Heat 2

Heat 4

Heat 6

Heat 8

Quarterfinals

Heat 1

Heat 3

Heat 2

Heat 4

Semifinals

Heat 1

Heat 2

Finals

Small final

Big final

References

Men's snowboard cross